The Estadio Yaquis is a stadium in Ciudad Obregón, Mexico.  It is primarily used for baseball and serves as the home stadium for Yaquis de Obregón. It holds 16,000 people. The construction of the venue started in 2014, and it opened in 2016.

It was inaugurated on 12 October 2016, by then-governor of Sonora, Claudia Pavlovich Arellano.

References

Tomas Oros Gaytan
Sports venues in Sonora